Frankie Cocozza (born 17 January 1993) is a British singer from Brighton, England who was a former contestant on The X Factor. He is currently the lead singer of British pop-rock band the Telescreen.

Life and career
He appeared in The X Factor and was put through to the live shows by Gary Barlow in his Boys category (solo males aged 16–24) alongside Marcus Collins, Craig Colton and James Michael. However, on 8 November 2011, Cocozza left the show after breaking competition rules, admitting his life had "gone out of control" while taking part in the show. He was replaced by Amelia Lily, who was eliminated in the first live show by her mentor Kelly Rowland. He has released 2 EPs, a sell-out tour, and is currently working on an album with his band, the Telescreen.

In January 2012, months after leaving The X Factor, Cocozza became a housemate on the ninth series of Celebrity Big Brother. He finished in second place losing out to actress and television presenter Denise Welch.

On 5 November 2012, Cocozza released his debut EP online, which reached No. 19 on iTunes. 'She's Got A Motorcycle' was released as a single, with an accompanying video posted to YouTube. The music video shows Cocozza riding a motorcycle towards a wall of fire. The single reached number 89 in the UK chart.

On 21 April 2013, Cocozza released his second EP to iTunes, titled 'Embrace' which failed to chart Five months later, on 13 September 2013, Cocozza and his band The Telescreen announced through their official PledgeMusic site that they were planning to release a debut album set to launch early 2014 if funding succeeded. On 26 February 2014, Cocozza released his band's debut single 'Kids' online.

Personal life

Cocozza married Bianca Murphy in 2018. The couple live in Sydney, Australia. Their son was born in May 2019.

Discography

Extended plays/EPs

Singles

References

External links
 

1993 births
Living people
British people of Italian descent
Italian British musicians
The X Factor (British TV series) contestants
21st-century British singers
21st-century British male singers